When You're Alone, You're Not Alone Is Forgive Durden's second EP. It was released independently and was available for purchase at shows.

Track listing
"B as in Burn" – 0:57
"No Ace, Just You" – 2:43
"I am a Heart, Watson. The Rest of Me Is Mere Appendix." – 3:36
"Caelestis" – 2:32
"Jamais Vu" – 3:42
"The Sour and the Sweet" – 3:08
"I'm a Sucker for Fakes" – 3:15

Forgive Durden albums
2004 EPs